Conant is an unincorporated community in Allen County, in the U.S. state of Ohio.

History
Conant had its start in 1884 when the Chicago and Atlantic Railroad was extended to that point. A post office called Conant was established in 1884, and remained in operation until 1919.

References

Unincorporated communities in Allen County, Ohio
1884 establishments in Ohio
Populated places established in 1884
Unincorporated communities in Ohio